Spring Lake may refer to:

Populated places

Canada
 Spring Lake, Alberta

United States
Spring Lake, Hernando County, Florida
Spring Lake, Highlands County, Florida
Spring Lake Township, Tazewell County, Illinois
Spring Lake, Indiana
Spring Lake, Michigan
Spring Lake Township, Ottawa County, Michigan
Spring Lake, Minnesota (disambiguation), multiple locations
Spring Lake Township, Scott County, Minnesota
 Spring Lake, Isanti County, Minnesota
 Spring Lake, Itasca County, Minnesota
 Spring Lake, Scott County, Minnesota
Spring Lake (Omaha, Nebraska), a historic neighborhood in Omaha, Nebraska
Spring Lake, New Jersey
Spring Lake, North Carolina
 Spring Lake, Rhode Island
Springlake, Texas
Spring Lake, Utah
Spring Lake, Wisconsin, a town
Spring Lake, Waushara County, Wisconsin, an unincorporated community

Lakes
 Spring Lake (Alberta)
Spring Lake (Fulton County, Arkansas), a lake in Fulton County, Arkansas
Spring Lake (Garland County, Arkansas), a lake in Garland County, Arkansas
Spring Lake (Prairie County, Arkansas), a lake in Prairie County, Arkansas
Spring Lake (Pulaski County, Arkansas), a lake in Pulaski County, Arkansas
Spring Lake (Saline County, Arkansas), a lake in Saline County, Arkansas
Spring Lake (Prairie County, Arkansas), a lake in Prairie County, Arkansas
Spring Lake (Yell County, Arkansas), a lake in Yell County, Arkansas
Spring Lake (Winter Haven), a lake in Winter Haven, Florida
Spring Lake (Independence Township, Michigan)
Spring Lake (Dakota County, Minnesota)
Spring Lake (Scott County, Minnesota), a lake in Scott County, Minnesota
Spring Lake (St. Louis County, Minnesota), a lake in St. Louis County, Minnesota
Spring Lake (Berlin, New York), a lake in the Town of Berlin, Rensselaer County, New York
Spring Lake (Delaware County, New York), a lake in New York
Spring Lake (Texas), a pool formed by San Marcos Springs at a resort named Aquarena Springs, San Marcos, Texas
Spring Lake (Day County, South Dakota), a lake in Day County, South Dakota
Spring Lake (Kingsbury County, South Dakota), a lake in Kingsbury County, South Dakota
Spring Lake (Providence County, Rhode Island), a lake in the town of Burrillville, Rhode Island
Spring Lake (Waushara County, Wisconsin)

Parks
Spring Lake (San Marcos, Texas), a body of water in San Marcos, Texas
Spring Lake Regional Park in Santa Rosa, California

Other
 Spring Lake (NJT station)

See also 
 Spring Banks Lake
 Spring Valley Lake
 Spring Lake Township (disambiguation)
Spring (disambiguation)